Yoshiko Inuzuka (犬塚 賀子, Inuzuka Yoshiko, born January 20, 1969), known by her former stage name , is a former Japanese actress known for her role as Haruna Morikawa in the TV series Kōsoku Sentai Turboranger. The thirteenth entry of Toei Company's Super Sentai series, the program aired on TV Asahi on March 3, 1989 to February 23, 1990 with a total of 50 episodes.

Filmography

References

 
 
 『福島民報』1988年8月22日付朝刊20面。「出番・木之原賀子」
 
 
周刊テレビ番組（東京ポスト）1988年9月9日号「プロフィール」52頁

External links
 
  An interview to the Turboranger cast in japanese on YouTube, in which her stage name is spelled as Yoshiko Kinohara at the minute 4:04

Living people
Japanese actresses
1969 births